Carl Busch (29 March 1862, Bjerre – 19 December 1943, Kansas City) was a Danish-born American composer and music teacher sometimes associated with the Indianist movement.  He was an important figure in the musical life of Kansas City, Missouri for many years.

Background
Busch was born in Bjerre, on Jutland, to a lawyer and his wife, and was the youngest of five children.  His father hoped that he would follow him into the legal profession, but Carl was more interested in pursuing a career in music, learning to play the flute, violin, and cello.  He studied and played under many of the notables of the day, including Niels Wilhelm Gade and Johan Peter Emilius Hartmann; he also worked under Johan Svendsen.  The abilities he showed in his studies led to the offer of a scholarship to the conservatory in Brussels, from which city he went to Paris.  There he played under Charles Gounod and Benjamin Godard, and became acquainted with Camille Saint-Saëns as well.  From Paris he returned to Denmark for a time before leaving for the United States.

Career
Denmark's vice-consul in Kansas City was one Thyge Skogaard, a former music publisher, and he encouraged Busch to come to the United States.  Consequently, in 1887 he and three friends formed a group called the Gade Quartet and came to America, eventually coming to Kansas City.  In addition to playing and conducting, he also began to teach, and soon became known in local cultural circles.  When the Philharmonic Choral Society was formed, he was chosen as its director.  Through this position he met pianist Sallie Smith, one of the Society's members, who became his wife after a short courtship.  In 1911, one of the groups with which Busch was associated became the Kansas City Symphony Orchestra; he stayed with it as director for a further seven years, until his activities were curtailed by American entry into World War I.  At the same time, he was active as a composer, and served as a guest conductor elsewhere as well.

In 1912, the King of Denmark made Busch a Knight of the Order of the Dannebrog;  consequently, he is sometimes referred to as "Sir Carl".  More recognition came in the form of the Royal Norwegian Order of St. Olav, into which he was inducted in 1924. He was initiated as an honorary member of Phi Mu Alpha Sinfonia fraternity by the Fraternity's Chi chapter at the University of Washington in 1913.

The Kansas City Philharmonic, led by Karl Krueger, honored him at a concert in 1938, upon which occasion one newspaper referred to him as "Kansas City's own outstanding composer and for fifty years its most noted musician.""  He taught at the Kansas City-Horner Conservatory, and was one of the first faculty members of the University of Kansas City.  He spent summers teaching and conducting as well, being invited to work at the University of Chicago and University of Notre Dame and at the Interlochen Center for the Arts in Michigan.  He also frequently summered in Battle Creek, Michigan, as a guest of one of his former pupils.  Busch also enjoyed woodcarving and pressing flowers, hobbies which took up more of his time in later years.

Busch's wife died in 1939; Busch himself died in Kansas City in 1943.

Music
Busch was especially noted for his works based on themes from the Western United States, and he would frequently incorporate American Indian themes into his music.  He set many tribal songs as solos, and reworked some into larger pieces such as the Four Indian Tribal Melodies for string orchestra, based upon the music of the Omaha and Chippewa.  Other works, such as A Chant from the Great Plains for band, are more generically "Western" in their inspiration.  Among Busch's other works was the suite Ozarka, about the Ozarks in southern Missouri.

The Sousa Archives and Center for American Music houses the Carl Busch Papers and Music Instrument Collection, ca. 1833-1924. This collection consists of original and published music by Busch and other musicians, correspondence, newspaper and journal clippings, photographs, programs, books and music instruments.  There is also a bust of Busch in that collection, sculpted by Jorgen Dreyer in 1912.

Notes and references

External links
 

 https://web.archive.org/web/20120724150614/http://www.kclibrary.org/blog/kc-unbound/carrie-westlake-whitney-and-carl-busch-christmas-greeting-kansas-city-children

Danish emigrants to the United States
American male composers
American composers
American conductors (music)
American male conductors (music)
Musicians from Kansas City, Missouri
1862 births
1943 deaths
Knights of the Order of the Dannebrog
University of Missouri–Kansas City faculty
Classical musicians from Missouri